Aaron Randal Ripkowski (born December 20, 1992) is a former American football fullback. He played college football at Oklahoma, and was drafted by the Green Bay Packers in the sixth round of the 2015 NFL Draft.

Early years
Ripkowski attended and played high school football at Dayton High School.

College career
Ripkowski attended the University of Oklahoma, where he played on the Oklahoma Sooners football team from 2011 to 2014 under head coach Bob Stoops. In the 2013 season, he had one reception for a three-yard touchdown on the season. In the 2014 season, he had seven receptions for 38 receiving yards and a receiving touchdown to go along with six carries for 13 rushing yards and three rushing touchdowns. In four years at Oklahoma, he appeared in 47 games and started 17.

College statistics

Professional career

Green Bay Packers

2015 season
Ripkowski was selected in the sixth round (206th overall) by the Green Bay Packers in the 2015 NFL Draft. On May 8, 2015, he signed a contract with the Packers. In his rookie season, Ripkowski was the Packers' backup fullback behind veteran John Kuhn. He appeared in 15 games, finishing the year with nine tackles on special teams. Ripkowski recorded his first career NFL reception, an 18-yard catch and run from quarterback Aaron Rodgers against the Carolina Panthers in Week 9. Overall, he appeared in fifteen regular season games and two playoff games.

2016 season
In 2016, entering his second year, Ripkowski became the starting fullback after the Packers did not re-sign John Kuhn. As the 2016 season progressed, Ripkowski's role expanded due to injuries to running backs Eddie Lacy and James Starks. He finished the 2016 regular season with 34 carries for 150 rushing yards and two rushing touchdowns to go along with nine receptions for 46 receiving yards and one receiving touchdown. The Packers finished with a 10–6 record and made the playoffs. In the Wild Card Round against the New York Giants, he had two carries for one rushing yard and one rushing touchdown to go along with two receptions for 11 receiving yards in the 38–13 victory. In the Divisional Round against the Dallas Cowboys, he had four carries for 24 rushing yards in the 34–31 victory. In the NFC Championship against the Atlanta Falcons, he had three carries for 11 rushing yards and two receptions for 28 receiving yards in the 44–21 loss.

2017 season
In the 2017 season, Ripkowski appeared in all 16 games and recorded five carries for 13 rushing yards and seven receptions for 39 receiving yards.

2018 season
On September 1, 2018, Ripkowski was released by the Packers.

Kansas City Chiefs
On January 31, 2019, Ripkowski signed a reserve/future contract with the Kansas City Chiefs. He was waived on May 3, 2019.

NFL career statistics

References

External links
Green Bay Packers bio
Oklahoma Sooners bio

1992 births
Living people
American football fullbacks
American people of Polish descent
Green Bay Packers players
Kansas City Chiefs players
Oklahoma Sooners football players
People from Dayton, Texas
Players of American football from Texas
Sportspeople from the Houston metropolitan area